Oddvar Richardsen (5 June 1937 – 18 July 1997) was a Norwegian football striker and later manager.

He started his career in local clubs Tjalg and Brønnøysund, and the first from Brønnøysund to become Norwegian league champion. He played for Lillestrøm from 1957, becoming league champion in 1959. He represented Norway as an under-21, B and senior international. From 1967 to 1971 he played for Ull/Kisa.

After a time as player-coach of Ull/Kisa, in 1972 he coached Lillestrøm, and ahead of the 1973 season he joined Raumnes og Årnes IL.

His son Rune Richardsen was also capped for Norway. They were the eighth father-son combination to be capped.

References

1937 births
1997 deaths
People from Brønnøy
Norwegian footballers
Lillestrøm SK players
Ullensaker/Kisa IL players
Norway under-21 international footballers
Norway international footballers
Association football forwards
Norwegian football managers
Ullensaker/Kisa IL managers
Lillestrøm SK managers
Sportspeople from Nordland